The New Zealand cricket team toured England in the 1969 season to play a three-match Test series against England. The New Zealanders played in the second half of the English season: the England cricket team played three Test matches against the West Indies cricket team in the earlier part of the season, winning that series by 2–0 with one match drawn - see the article West Indian cricket team in England in 1969.

England won the series against the New Zealanders also by 2–0 with one match drawn. On the tour as a whole, the New Zealanders played 18 first-class matches, including the Tests, and won four of them, with three defeats. All the other matches were drawn.

After this tour the New Zealanders continued touring, playing test series in India and Pakistan till mid November 1969.

The New Zealand Team
The New Zealand team was captained by Graham Dowling, with Vic Pollard as vice-captain.

The full team was:
 Graham Dowling (captain)
 Vic Pollard (vice-captain)
 Mark Burgess
 Richard Collinge
 Bevan Congdon
 Bob Cunis
 Dayle Hadlee
 Brian Hastings
 Hedley Howarth
 Barry Milburn
 Dick Motz
 Bruce Murray
 Bruce Taylor
 Glenn Turner
 Ken Wadsworth
 Bryan Yuile

Seven of the side – Dowling, Pollard, Collinge, Congdon, Motz, Taylor and Yuile – had toured England with the 1965 touring party. Only Hadlee, Howarth and Wadsworth had not played Test cricket before this tour and all three of them made their Test debuts during the tour. Milburn and Yuile, both of whom had played Test cricket before this tour, did not feature in the Test matches this season.

The Test Matches

First Test at Lord's, 24–28 July 1969

There was little between the teams after low-scoring first innings in which only Ray Illingworth, England's captain, reached 50. In the second innings John Edrich scored 115 and shared a century opening partnership with Geoffrey Boycott. Apart from Turner, who carried his bat for a dour 43, New Zealand did not cope well with Derek Underwood's left-arm spin and his 7-32 gave England a comfortable victory.

Second Test at Trent Bridge, 7–12 August 1969

Almost all of the third and fifth days were lost to the weather, so that New Zealand comfortably saved the game in spite of a big deficit on first innings. For New Zealand, Congdon (66) and Hastings (83) put on 150 for the third wicket, at the time a New Zealand record in England. Edrich (155) and Phil Sharpe (111) responded with a second wicket partnership of 246.

Third Test at The Oval, 21–26 August 1969

Underwood undermined the New Zealand batting, taking six wickets in each innings to finish the series with 24 wickets at an average of 9.16 runs each. Turner made a three-hour 53 in New Zealand's first innings, and Hastings a three-and-a-half-hour 61 in the second, but none of the other batsmen managed more than 30. Edrich made 68 in England's first innings and Mike Denness in his first Test match took England home on the last afternoon with an unbeaten 55. The match was stretched out to the full five days because of constant showers.

Other First-Class Matches
A total of 15 other first-class matches were played between the end of June and the middle of September. A three-day game with D. H. Robins' XI at Eastbourne in mid-June was not counted as first-class.

The New Zealanders recorded victories over Scotland, the Minor Counties, Warwickshire and T. N. Pearce's XI. Apart from the defeats in the Test matches, their only other defeat on tour was by Essex by the narrow margin of 15 runs. The 10 other games, all with first-class counties, were drawn.

References

Annual reviews
 Playfair Cricket Annual 1970
 Wisden Cricketers' Almanack 1970

External links
 CricketArchive – tour itineraries

1969 in English cricket
1969 in New Zealand cricket
International cricket competitions from 1960–61 to 1970
1969
July 1969 sports events in the United Kingdom
August 1969 sports events in the United Kingdom